Bourne station is a train station in Bourne, Massachusetts, served by the CapeFlyer.

History

Former station

The first Bourne station was built by the Cape Cod Branch Railroad when the railroad line was extended from Wareham to Sandwich in 1848. It was located at what is now Old Bridge Road on the north side of the Monument River, approximately where the north canal service road / bike path is now located.

CapeFLYER station
In September 2014 it was announced that local officials were considering a new station along the CapeFlyer route in Bourne for the 2015 season. According to the announcement, the station stop would be located on government land under the Bourne Bridge. In November 2014 the state announced construction of the station would occur, along with trackside improvements and signal houses on both sides of the bridge, as well as improvements to switches in the area. Additionally, a 4,000 foot siding would be constructed so trains could wait at the bridge.

In February 2015, it was announced that station construction would be delayed for one year, due to the amount of winter snow and local unease over the project. The station was also considered as a possible stop for future commuter rail. In September 2015, however, it was announced that plans to build the station were suspended, and although there was still a push by some within the community to build the station behind the Gallo Ice Arena, no official proposals or plans were made.

Discussions on the station were effectively nonexistent for the following three years, until it was announced that a smaller station would be built for service during the 2019 season. While initial plans for a fully constructed station were not realized, a prefabricated section of high-level platform was installed in May 2019 at the Bourne Bridge site, which the CapeFlyer began serving shortly after completion. Parking areas are not provided, as the station is primarily intended for train passengers to be picked up or dropped off.

Possible commuter rail service
In late 2020 and early 2021, MassDOT conducted a study evaluating the feasibility of extending commuter rail service from Middleborough/Lakeville station to Bourne. Upon conclusion of the study in spring 2021, two different alternatives for service were presented, one of which would terminate at Bourne station.

References

Bourne, Massachusetts
Old Colony Railroad Stations on Cape Cod
Stations along Old Colony Railroad lines
MBTA Commuter Rail stations in Barnstable County, Massachusetts